Aandhiyan is a 1952 Hindi drama, written and directed by Chetan Anand. The story was written by Chetan Anand and Hameed Butt, based on an actual event in Amritsar. It stars Dev Anand, Kalpana Kartik, Nimmi in lead roles. The music of the film was composed by the classical musician Ali Akbar Khan, with lyrics by Narendra Sharma.

Jaidev, who was a student of Khan from Lucknow, and later became a noted music director, started his career by assisting Khan in film music. The background score of the film was also done by Ali Akbar Khan along with other Hindustani classical musicians Pandit Ravi Shankar and Pannalal Ghosh. Lata Mangeshkar sang the title song "Har Kahin Pe Shaadmani", and as a token of her respect to sarod maestro, did not charge any fee. The dances were choreographed by Lakshmi Shankar, who also sang a song, while Gopi Krishan choreographed his own dances.

Plot
Ram Mohan (Dev Anand) an honest lawyer is in love with Janki (Kalpana Kartik) the beautiful daughter of Lala Dindayal (M. A. Latif). Dindayal accepts the marriage proposal. On the other side, Kuberdas (K. N. Singh), a rich businessman has a lustful eye over Janki. In order to marry Janki he devises a wicked plan. He asks the already cash strapped Dindayal to either sell of his assets and repay the loan he had given in the past or give his daughter Janki's hand in marriage. Will Janki sacrifice her personal happiness for her father? What will Ram Mohan do to stop the evil Kuberdas? This is the rest of the story.

Cast
 Dev Anand as Advocate Ram Mohan
 Kalpana Kartik as Janki
 Nimmi as Rani
 K. N. Singh as Kuberdas
 Johnny Walker as Mastram
 M. A. Latif as Lala Dindayal
 Leela Mishra as Mrs. Dindayal
 Durga Khote as Ram's Mother
 Pratima Devi as Rampyari

Soundtrack

References

External links

 
 

1952 films
1950s Hindi-language films
Drama films based on actual events
Indian black-and-white films
Films scored by Ali Akbar Khan
Indian drama films
Films set in Amritsar
Films directed by Chetan Anand
Hindi-language drama films
1952 drama films